The 2016 Toyota Grand Prix of Long Beach was the third round of the 2016 IndyCar Series and the 42nd annual running of the Toyota Grand Prix of Long Beach. The race was contested over 80 laps on a temporary street circuit in Long Beach, California on April 17, 2016. Hélio Castroneves qualified on pole for the second consecutive race with a time of 1:07.1246. Chip Ganassi Racing's Scott Dixon started alongside him in second. Some confusion surrounded the second round of qualifying as timing and scoring malfunctioned. IndyCar officials would correct the mistakes caused by this and set the correct Fast Six qualifiers shortly after round two ended. Fast six qualifying was briefly delayed when Will Power clipped a tire barrier and went into a run-off area. Power started sixth due to his mishap.

Castroneves took the lead from the start and led 49 of the opening 51 laps. Behind him, Simon Pagenaud was able to move his way past Scott Dixon into second, while Dixon was scuffled down to fourth by the time the first round of pit stops came. During pit stops, Dixon was able to leapfrog Pagenaud and his teammate Tony Kanaan to move up to second. At the second round of stops, Dixon was able to pass Castroneves with quick pit work. However, Simon Pagenaud was able to move even faster and get out of the pits just ahead of Dixon, handing Pagenaud the lead of the race. Controversy surrounded this, though, as Pagenaud placed two tires over the blend line at the exit of pit lane while trying to beat Dixon to turn one. IndyCar officials let Pagenaud off with a warning for the incident, despite protests from Chip Ganassi Racing and Scott Dixon. In the end, Pagenaud was able to hold on and take victory by 0.3032 seconds, the closest finish in the history of the Grand Prix of Long Beach. It was Pagenaud's first victory while driving for Team Penske and his first win since the second race of the 2014 Grand Prix of Houston.

For only the 4th time in the history of the race, no full course caution occurred at any point and for the second year in a row, there were no DNFs.

Report

Qualifying

Race results

Notes
 Points include 1 point for leading at least 1 lap during a race, an additional 2 points for leading the most race laps, and 1 point for Pole Position.

Source for time gaps:

Championship standings after the race

Drivers' Championship standings

 Note: Only the top five positions are included.

References

External links
 Official Pit Stop Data
 Official Race Broadcast

Toyota Grand Prix of Long Beach
Grand Prix of Long Beach
Toyota Grand Prix of Long Beach
Toyota Grand Prix of Long Beach